John James (18 January 1934 – 8 December 2010) was a leading Australian rules footballer in the Victorian Football League (VFL). He won the Brownlow Medal, the highest individual honour in the sport,  in 1961.

Recruited from St. Patrick's College, Ballarat, James played for the Carlton Football Club from 1953 to 1963, playing 195 games. He finished third in the 1957 Brownlow Medal count and won the award in 1961. He won the Carlton Best and Fairest three times (in 1955, 1960 and 1961). James was named on the half-back flank in the Carlton Team of the Century.

In his debut season, James played off a half-forward flank and booted the terribly inaccurate figures of eight goals, 43 behinds. Throughout his career he played in a variety of positions, including the backline. After his retirement in 1963, he went to coach Robinvale.

James died in Robinvale, Victoria, on 8 December 2010, following a stroke.

References

External links

John James's Blueseum profile

1934 births
2010 deaths
Brownlow Medal winners
Carlton Football Club players
John Nicholls Medal winners
Australian rules footballers from Victoria (Australia)
People educated at St Patrick's College, Ballarat